Mark O'Brien (born 16 September 1987 in Horsham) is an Australian cyclist, who rides for Australian amateur team InForm TM Insight MAKE.

Major results

2008
 3rd Road race, National Under-23 Road Championships
2009
 3rd Road race, National Under-23 Road Championships
2010
 1st Stage 5 Jelajah Malaysia
 2nd Melbourne to Warrnambool Classic
2012
 1st Overall Mersey Valley Tour
1st Stage 2
 1st Overall Tour of Toowoomba
1st Stage 2
 1st Overall North Western Tour 
1st Stage 3
 2nd Tour of Tasmania
 Oceania Cycling Championships
3rd Road race
4th Time trial
2014
 2nd Overall Tour of Toowoomba
1st Stage 3 (TTT)
 2nd Baw Baw Classic
 3rd Overall Battle of the Border
1st stage 1 
 9th Overall Tour Alsace
2016
 2nd New Zealand Cycle Classic
 2nd REV Classic
 3rd Road race, Oceania Cycling Championships
2017
 10th Road race, National Road Championships
2019
 7th Road race, National Road Championships
2020
1st Peaks Challenge Falls Creek
2021
 8th Road race, National Road Championships

 12th Peaks Challenge Falls Creek
 1st King of the Peaks (KOP)

References

External links

1987 births
Living people
Australian male cyclists